Jesse L. Dark (born September 2, 1951 in Richmond, Virginia) is an American retired professional basketball shooting guard who spent one season in the National Basketball Association (NBA) with the New York Knicks during the 1974–75 season. The Knicks drafted Dark from the Virginia Commonwealth University during the 1974 NBA Draft in the second round (32 overall).

External links

1951 births
Living people
American men's basketball players
Basketball players from Richmond, Virginia
Maggie L. Walker Governor's School for Government and International Studies alumni
New York Knicks draft picks
New York Knicks players
Shooting guards
VCU Rams men's basketball players